WRKY may refer to:

 WRKY (AM), a radio station (1490 AM) licensed to serve Lancaster, Pennsylvania
 WRKY-FM, a radio station (104.9 FM) licensed to Hollidaysburg, Pennsylvania
 WRKY transcription factor, proteins that bind DNA
 WRKY protein domain, a protein domain within the WRKY transcription factor
 WBZB, a radio station (1130 AM) licensed to Murray, Kentucky, which held the call sign WRKY from 2000 to 2006
 WOGH, a radio station (103.5 FM) licensed to Burgettstown, Pennsylvania, which held the call sign WRKY until 2000